Clematis occidentalis is a species of flowering plant in the buttercup family known by the common name western blue virginsbower. It is native to much of southern Canada and the northern United States. There are three varieties: var. occidentalis is limited to the eastern half of the species' range, var. grosseserrata to the western half, and var. dissecta is endemic to Washington. The plant varies somewhat in appearance. Generally they produce vines and climb on surfaces. The leaves are divided into three thick, green leaflets, which may have lobes or teeth. The flower has no petals, but petallike sepals which are usually either deep purple-blue in western populations or reddish purple in eastern plants. White flowers are rare.

External links

USDA Plants Profile
Flora of North America

occidentalis
Flora of North America
Plants described in 1815